The pair skating event was held as part of the figure skating at the 1936 Winter Olympics. It was the sixth appearance of the event, which had previously been held twice at the Summer Olympics in 1908 and 1920 and at all three Winter Games from 1924 onward. The competition was held on Thursday, 13 February 1936. Thirty-six figure skaters from twelve nations competed.

Results
The points and score are given as shown in the official Olympic report.

Referee:
  Hermann Wendt

Judges:
  Charles M. Rotch
  Kurt Dannenberg
  August Anderberg
  Arnold Huber
  Hans Grünauer
  André Poplimont
  Oscar Kolderup
  Jenő Minnich
  Ludowika Jacobsson

References

External links
 Official Olympic Report
 sports-reference
 

Figure skating at the 1936 Winter Olympics
1936 in figure skating
1936
Mixed events at the 1936 Winter Olympics